Squitieri is a surname. Notable people with the surname include:

Arnold Squitieri (born 1936), American criminal
Pasquale Squitieri (1938–2017), Italian film director and screenwriter
Tom Squitieri (born 1953), American journalist, public speaker, and public relations specialist